Stephen C. Minkin Paleozoic Footprint Site, formerly the Union Chapel Mine, is a former coal mine that became an important fossil site in Alabama after an Oneonta High School science teacher discovered tracks in the rocks at the site while preparing for a school field trip. The mine belonged to a family member of one of the children in his class. It is east of Jasper, Alabama in Walker County, Alabama.

According to a research paper, the site was once part of a "swampy tropical forest adjacent to a tidal flat during the Coal Age or Carboniferous Period more than 300 million years ago. That fecund strand of sand and mud at the ocean’s edge teemed with the earth’s earliest reptiles as well as amphibians, fish, horseshoe crabs, spiders, jumping insects, and other fascinating organisms."

The site is paleozoic. Tetrapod fossils have been found at it. The site is one of the most abundant sources of trackways of its age.

Treptichnus and Arenicolites have been found at the site.
 
The 2016 book Footprints in Stone by Ronald J. Buta and David C. Kopaska-Merkel is about the site and its discovery. In 2012 they wrote a guidebook for the site.

Digs open to the public have been held at the site. Ichnofossils including various Kouphichnium have been found at the site.

Alabama Public Television aired a Discovering Alabama episode on fossiling and fossil sites in Alabama including this one.

References

Paleontological sites
Former coal mines